The Catostomidae are the suckers of the order Cypriniformes, with about 78 species in this family  of freshwater fishes. The Catostomidae are almost exclusively native to North America. The only exceptions are Catostomus catostomus, found in both North America and Russia, and Myxocyprinus asiaticus found only in China. In the Ozarks they are a common food fish and a festival is held each year to celebrate them. Ictiobus cyprinellus can reach an age up to 112 years, making it the oldest known freshwater teleost.

Description and biology

The mouths of these fish are most commonly located on the underside of their head (subterminal), with thick, fleshy lips. They are distinguished from related fish by having a long pharyngeal bone in the throat, containing a single row of teeth.

Catostomids are most often found in rivers, but can be found in any freshwater environment.  Their food ranges from detritus and bottom-dwelling organisms (such as crustaceans and worms), to surface insects, crayfish, small terrestrial vertebrates, and other fish.

Fossil record
Catostomidae have been uncovered and dated to the Middle Eocene in Colorado and Utah.  An enormous gap (36.2 million years) in the fossil record occurs from the Late Eocene to Early Pleistocene.

As food

They can be taken by many fishing methods, including angling and gigging. Often, species such as Catostomus commersonii and Hypentelium nigricans are preferred for eating. They can be canned, smoked, or fried, but small incisions often must be made in the flesh (termed "scoring") before frying to allow small internal bones to be palatable. Suckers were an important source of food for Indigenous Americans across the continent. Many fishing methods were employed with the most elaborate being stone fish traps constructed on spawning rivers, remnants of these traps can be seen today in Ahjumawi Lava Springs State Park where the Achomawi people trapped Sacramento suckers. In the west these relationships became even more important after the decline in salmon runs due to damming and habitat destruction, some groups of native people relied on seasonal sucker runs for a significant amount of their food until the 1950s.

In China there is a significant aquaculture industry dedicated to raising Myxocyprinus asiaticus for food. Historically they were an important component of wild fisheries on the Yangtze, but the wild populations are under pressure from pollution, habitat destruction and hydroelectric dam projects.

Recreational fishing 
Some Catostomidae, especially those of Ictiobus and Moxostoma, are the subject of major recreational fisheries while most are the subject of at least limited recreational fisheries. Throughout much of their range species are considered to be rough fish. Suckers have historically been scapegoated for human environmental destruction and their impacts on popular fish species such as Pacific salmon and smallmouth bass. This has led to their widespread and unnecessary destruction at the hands of ignorant anglers.

Subfamilies, tribes, and genera 

 Subfamily Catostominae
 Tribe Catostomini
 Genus Catostomus
 Genus Chasmistes
 Genus Deltistes
 Genus Xyrauchen
 Tribe Erimyzoninae
 Genus Erimyzon
 Genus Minytrema
Tribe Thoburniinae
 Genus Hypentelium
 Genus Thoburnia
Tribe Moxostomatini
 Genus Moxostoma
 Subfamily Cycleptinae
 Genus Cycleptus
 Subfamily Ictiobinae
 Genus †Amyzon 
 Genus Carpiodes
 Genus Ictiobus
 Subfamily Myxocyprininae
 Genus Myxocyprinus
 other extinct genera
 Genus †Jianghanichthys
 Genus †Plesiomyxocyprinus
 Genus †Vasnetzovia

References 

 
 

 
Cypriniformes
Fish of North America
Taxa named by Edward Drinker Cope
Fish of Asia
Ray-finned fish families